In enzymology, an UDP-N-acetylmuramate dehydrogenase is an enzyme that catalyzes the chemical reaction

UDP-N-acetyl-alpha-D-muramate + NADP+  UDP-N-acetyl-3-O-(1-carboxyvinyl)-alpha-D-glucosamine + NADPH + H+

Thus, the two substrates of this enzyme are UDP-N-acetyl-alpha-D-muramate and NADP+, whereas its 3 products are UDP-N-acetyl-3-O-(1-carboxyvinyl)-alpha-D-glucosamine, NADPH, and H+.

This enzyme belongs to the family of oxidoreductases, specifically those acting on the CH-CH group of donor with NAD+ or NADP+ as acceptor. The systematic name of this enzyme class is UDP-N-acetyl-alpha-D-muramate:NADP+ oxidoreductase. Other names in common use include MurB reductase, UDP-N-acetylenolpyruvoylglucosamine reductase, UDP-N-acetylglucosamine-enoylpyruvate reductase, UDP-GlcNAc-enoylpyruvate reductase, uridine diphosphoacetylpyruvoylglucosamine reductase, uridine diphospho-N-acetylglucosamine-enolpyruvate reductase, uridine-5'-diphospho-N-acetyl-2-amino-2-deoxy-3-O-lactylglucose:NADP-oxidoreductase. This enzyme participates in aminosugars metabolism. It employs one cofactor, FAD.

Structural studies

References

 
 
 

EC 1.3.1
NADPH-dependent enzymes
Flavoproteins
Enzymes of known structure